"Trouble" is the first track on the debut album of the same name by American folk singer Ray LaMontagne. The album was released by RCA on September 14, 2004. The single also appeared on LaMontagne's Live from Bonnaroo EP, released in 2005, as well as the 2007 compilation album, The Saturday Sessions: The Dermot O'Leary Show.

The single charted at number 25 on the UK Singles Chart in March 2005, staying on the chart for a ten-week run.

In popular media
This song appeared in a Travelers Insurance campaign featuring a dog concerned over the security of his bone. It was also in "Out of Time", an episode of Torchwood, an episode of "The Office", an episode of  Rescue Me, an episode of "Alias", the film A Lot like Love, and the finale of the first season of True Blood.

Certifications

References

External links
 Trouble Lyrics

2005 songs
2004 songs
Ray LaMontagne songs
RCA Records singles
Songs written by Ray LaMontagne